The Workers' General Party (Portuguese: Partido Geral dos Trabalhadores, PGT) was a centrist Brazilian political party.  In 2002, it merged with the Liberal Party, which has since merged with the Party of the Reconstruction of the National Order to create the Republic Party.

Defunct political parties in Brazil
Political parties established in 1995
1995 establishments in Brazil
Political parties disestablished in 2002
2002 disestablishments in Brazil